The Convention Relating to the Status of Stateless Persons is a 1954 United Nations multilateral treaty that aims to protect stateless individuals.

Surrounding events
The United Nations Charter and Universal Declaration of Human Rights were approved on 10 December 1948. Of significance, the Declaration at Article 15 affirms that:
 Everyone has the right to a nationality.
 No one shall be arbitrarily deprived of his nationality nor denied the right to change his nationality.

The Convention relating to the Status of Refugees was promulgated on 28 July 1951. Despite an original intention, it did not include any content about the status of stateless persons and there was no protocol regarding measures to effect the reduction of statelessness.

On 26 April 1954, ECOSOC adopted a Resolution to convene a Conference of Plenipotentiaries to "regulate and improve the status of stateless persons by an international agreement".

The ensuing Conference adopted the Convention on 28 September 1954.

The Convention entered into force on 6 June 1960.

Key substantive content of convention

Article 1 The Convention applies to stateless persons under the protection of the UNHCR but not to those under the protection of other UN agencies (i.e., UNWRA). It does not apply to persons with rights and obligations acknowledged by their country of residence as indistinguishable from those attached to the possession of that country's nationality. It does not apply to war criminals or to the perpetrators of crimes against humanity or against peace. It does not apply to those who have demonstrated themselves to have been enemies of international peace and co-operation.

Article 7 Contracting States shall accord to stateless persons the same treatment as is accorded to aliens generally.

Article 8 No "exceptional measures" to be taken against stateless persons in a Contracting State because of their former nationality.

Article 9 Provisional measures affecting stateless persons may be taken in time of war or grave emergency where national security is at issue.

Article 10 Forcible removal of a stateless person from territory of a Contracting State due to Second World War to count as residence in that territory.

Article 11 Admonition of States to show sympathy to stateless seaman regularly engaged on ships of that State's flag

Article 12 Personal status (e.g. marital status) of a stateless person to be governed by the law of his/her domicile ahead of the law of his/her residence.

Article 13 Rights to property to be no less than accorded to aliens generally.

Article 14 Intellectual property rights to be no less than accorded by a Contracting State to its own nationals.

Article 15 Right of association to be no less than accorded by each Contracting State to aliens generally.

Article 16 Stateless persons not to be discriminated against in providing "security for costs and eventual penalty", or otherwise by courts in Contracting States.

Articles 17–19 Stateless persons to be treated at least as favourably as aliens generally with regard to participation in wage-earning employment.

Articles 20–23 Stateless persons to be treated no less favourably than nationals with respect to rationing, housing, public education, and public relief.

Article 24 Extension of Articles 20–23 to labour legislation and social security.

Article 27 Upon request, Contracting States shall issue travel and identity documents to stateless persons within their territory.

Article 29 No discrimination against stateless persons in fiscal charges.

Article 30 Stateless persons to be permitted to transfer their assets to the place of their resettlement.

Article 31 Stateless persons not to be expelled except on grounds of national security or public order.

Article 32 Contracting States shall facilitate assimilation and naturalization of stateless persons.

Article 34 Interpretation disputes between State parties to be finally referable to the International Court of Justice (ICJ)

Remaining Clauses Territorial application; federal clause; signature, ratification and entry into force.

State parties
As of January 2022, the United Nations, the depository of the convention, lists 96 parties to the Convention; one states (Holy See) has signed the convention, but have not ratified it. The 96 parties are: Albania, Algeria, Angola, Antigua and Barbuda, Argentina, Armenia, Australia, Austria, Azerbaijan, Barbados, Belgium, Belize, Benin, Bolivia, Bosnia and Herzegovina, Botswana, Brazil, Bulgaria, Burkina Faso, Chad, Chile, Colombia, Costa Rica, Côte d'Ivoire, Croatia, Czech Republic, Denmark, Ecuador, El Salvador, Eswatini, Fiji, Finland, France, Gambia, Georgia, Germany, Greece, Guatemala, Guinea, Guinea-Bissau, Haiti, Honduras, Hungary, Iceland, Ireland, Israel, Italy, Kiribati, Latvia, Lesotho, Liberia, Libya, Liechtenstein, Lithuania, Luxembourg, Malawi, Mali, Malta, Mexico, Moldova, Montenegro, Mozambique, Netherlands, Nicaragua, Niger, Nigeria, North Macedonia, Norway, Panama, Paraguay, Peru, Philippines, Portugal, South Korea, Romania, Rwanda, Senegal, Serbia, Sierra Leone, Slovakia, Slovenia, Spain, Saint Vincent and the Grenadines, Sweden, Switzerland, Togo, Turkey, Trinidad and Tobago, Tunisia, Turkmenistan, Uganda, Ukraine, United Kingdom, Uruguay, Zambia, and Zimbabwe.

Madagascar denounced its accession made in 1962, effective 2 April 1966. The United Kingdom extended the convention to British Hong Kong, and China has declared that the convention continues to apply to Hong Kong post-1997.

See also
 1954 Convention Travel Document
 1961 Convention on the Reduction of Statelessness

Notes

External links 
 Introductory note by Guy S. Goodwin-Gill, procedural history note and audiovisual material on the Convention Relating to the Status of Stateless Persons in the Historic Archives of the United Nations Audiovisual Library of International Law
 Lectures by Guy S. Goodwin-Gill entitled International Migration Law  – A General Introduction and Forced Migration – The Evolution of International Refugee Law and Organization in the Lecture Series of the United Nations Audiovisual Library of International Law

Human rights instruments
United Nations treaties
Convention relating to the Status of Stateless Persons
Treaties concluded in 1954
Treaties entered into force in 1960
Treaties of Albania
Treaties of Algeria
Treaties of Antigua and Barbuda
Treaties of Argentina
Treaties of Armenia
Treaties of Australia
Treaties of Austria
Treaties of Azerbaijan
Treaties of Barbados
Treaties of Belgium
Treaties of Belize
Treaties of Benin
Treaties of Bolivia
Treaties of Bosnia and Herzegovina
Treaties of Botswana
Treaties of Brazil
Treaties of Bulgaria
Treaties of Burkina Faso
Treaties of Chad
Treaties extended to British Hong Kong
Treaties of Costa Rica
Treaties of Croatia
Treaties of the Czech Republic
Treaties of Denmark
Treaties of Ecuador
Treaties of El Salvador
Treaties of Fiji
Treaties of Finland
Treaties of France
Treaties of the Gambia
Treaties of Georgia (country)
Treaties of West Germany
Treaties of the Kingdom of Greece
Treaties of Guatemala
Treaties of Guinea
Treaties of Guinea-Bissau
Treaties of Haiti
Treaties of Honduras
Treaties of Hungary
Treaties of Ireland
Treaties of Israel
Treaties of Italy
Treaties of Ivory Coast
Treaties of Kiribati
Treaties of Latvia
Treaties of Lesotho
Treaties of Liberia
Treaties of the Libyan Arab Jamahiriya
Treaties of Liechtenstein
Treaties of Lithuania
Treaties of Luxembourg
Treaties of Malawi
Treaties of Mali
Treaties of Mexico
Treaties of Montenegro
Treaties of Mozambique
Treaties of the Netherlands
Treaties of Nicaragua
Treaties of Niger
Treaties of Nigeria
Treaties of Norway
Treaties of Panama
Treaties of Paraguay
Treaties of Peru
Treaties of the Philippines
Treaties of Portugal
Treaties of South Korea
Treaties of Moldova
Treaties of Romania
Treaties of Rwanda
Treaties of Senegal
Treaties of Serbia and Montenegro
Treaties of Yugoslavia
Treaties of Sierra Leone
Treaties of Slovakia
Treaties of Slovenia
Treaties of Spain
Treaties of Saint Vincent and the Grenadines
Treaties of Eswatini
Treaties of Sweden
Treaties of Switzerland
Treaties of North Macedonia
Treaties of Trinidad and Tobago
Treaties of Tunisia
Treaties of Turkey
Treaties of Turkmenistan
Treaties of Uganda
Treaties of Ukraine
Treaties of the United Kingdom
Treaties of Uruguay
Treaties of Zambia
Treaties of Zimbabwe
Nationality treaties
1954 in New York City
Treaties extended to Guernsey
Treaties extended to Jersey
Treaties extended to the Isle of Man
Treaties extended to Bermuda
Treaties extended to the British Virgin Islands
Treaties extended to the Falkland Islands
Treaties extended to Saint Helena, Ascension and Tristan da Cunha
Treaties extended to Anguilla
Treaties extended to Montserrat
Treaties extended to the Turks and Caicos Islands
Treaties extended to the Faroe Islands
Treaties extended to Greenland
Treaties extended to French Algeria
Treaties extended to Guadeloupe
Treaties extended to Martinique
Treaties extended to Saint Pierre and Miquelon
Treaties extended to French Guiana
Treaties extended to New Caledonia
Treaties extended to French Polynesia
Treaties extended to French Somaliland
Treaties extended to French Comoros
Treaties extended to Netherlands New Guinea
Treaties extended to Surinam (Dutch colony)
Treaties extended to Basutoland
Treaties extended to the Bechuanaland Protectorate
Treaties extended to Swaziland (protectorate)
Treaties extended to British Guiana
Treaties extended to British Honduras
Treaties extended to the British Solomon Islands
Treaties extended to the Colony of Aden
Treaties extended to the Colony of Fiji
Treaties extended to the Gambia Colony and Protectorate
Treaties extended to the Gilbert and Ellice Islands
Treaties extended to British Kenya
Treaties extended to the Crown Colony of Malta
Treaties extended to British Mauritius
Treaties extended to the Colony of North Borneo
Treaties extended to the Colony of Sarawak
Treaties extended to the Crown Colony of Seychelles
Treaties extended to the Crown Colony of Singapore
Treaties extended to the Uganda Protectorate
Treaties extended to the West Indies Federation
Treaties extended to the Sultanate of Zanzibar
Treaties extended to the Federation of Rhodesia and Nyasaland
Treaties extended to West Berlin